Chigubo District is a district of Gaza Province in south-western Mozambique. The administrative center of the district is Dindiza. The district is located in the east of the province, and borders with Massangena District in the north, Mabote and Funhalouro Districts of Inhambane Province in the east, Chibuto District in the south, Guijá District in the southwest, Mabalane District in the west, and with Chicualacuala District in the northwest. It has a population of 20,685 (2007).

Geography
The Changane River, a major left tributary of the Limpopo River, makes a border of the district with Inhambane Province. The area of the district belongs to the drainage basin of the Limpopo.

The climate is tropical arid, with the average annual rainfall being .

Banhine National Park, part of Great Limpopo Transfrontier Park, is shared between Chigubo, Chicualacuala, and Mabalane Districts.

History
Until 1986, there was a posto in Chicualacuala District. In 1986, Chigubo District was established.

Demographics
As of 2005, 47% of the population of the district was younger than 15 years. 59% of the population spoke Portuguese. The most common mothertongue among the population was Tsonga. 82% were analphabetic, mostly women.

Administrative divisions
The district is divided into two postos, Chigubo (two localities) and Dindiza (alternatively spelled Ndindiza, two localities).

Economy
Less than 1% of the households in the district have access to electricity.

Agriculture
In the district, there are 2,500 farms which have on average  of land. The main agricultural products are corn, cassava, cowpea, peanut, sweet potato, and rice.

Transportation

References

Districts in Gaza Province
States and territories established in 1986
1986 establishments in Mozambique